Black Bitch may refer to:

 Total Control (TV series), Australian television drama series, provisionally titled Black Bitch 
 A person from the Scottish town of Linlithgow deriving from the black dog on the Coat of Arms
 A slang name for the Queen of Spades in the Hearts (card game)
 An Australian game played between friends when hiking. The friends secretly hide a bottle of alcohol at the bottom of another's pack, and declare it when they arrive at the summit. That person is the 'black bitch', and everyone takes a drink.